was a railway station on the JR Hokkaido Sekishō Line. It is located in Yūbari, Hokkaidō, Japan. The station was closed when the Yubari Branch Line ceased operation on 31 March 2019.

Lines
Shimizusawa Station was served by the Sekisho Line Yūbari Branch. The station was numbered "Y23".

Station layout
The station had one platform serving one track used by both Yūbari-bound and Shin-Yūbari or Oiwake-bound trains. Kitaca was not available. The station was unattended.

Surrounding area
 Shimizusawa Post office

Adjacent stations

References

Shimizusawa Station
Railway stations in Japan opened in 1897
Railway stations closed in 2019